Frank Scheffer (born 1956 in Venlo) is a Dutch cinematographer and producer of documentary film, mostly known for his work Conducting Mahler (1996) on the 1995 Mahler Festival in Amsterdam with Claudio Abbado, Riccardo Chailly, Riccardo Muti and Simon Rattle.

Education
Scheffer was schooled at the Academy for Industrial Design (Eindhoven), the "Vrije Academie" Art College in The Hague, where he studied with the famous experimental filmmaker Frans Zwartjes and is a graduate from the Dutch Film Academy in Amsterdam.

Early films
Early films include Zoetrope People (1982), a documentary on Francis Ford Coppola and his studio with Wim Wenders, Tom Waits, Vittorio Storaro and others, as well as documentaries on the Dalai Lama and various socio/cultural subjects. In 1985 he directed the music video A Day for the band XYMOX on the 4AD Records label, leading him towards musical subjects. 1987 saw his short experimental films Wagner‘s Ring, a distillation of The Ring in 3'50" conceived with John Cage; and Stoperas 1/2 which was created to be shown with Cage's Europeras 1 & 2. Collaborations with Cage continued with the conceptual film Chessfilmnoise (1988), a documentary on Cage and Elliott Carter Time Is Music (1988), and From Zero (1995) in collaboration with Andrew Culver.

The great composers
Scheffer’s films on music constitute an overview of the great composers of the 20th century — from Conducting Mahler (1996) on the 1995 Mahler Festival in Amsterdam with Claudio Abbado, Riccardo Chailly, Riccardo Muti and Simon Rattle to Five Orchestral Pieces (1994) on Arnold Schönberg's work conducted by Michael Gielen and The Final Chorale (1990) on Igor Stravinsky's Symphonies of Wind Instruments conducted by Reinbert de Leeuw.

Further documentaries include films on Louis Andriessen (The Road, 1997, conducted by Péter Eötvös), Luciano Berio (Voyage to Cythera from 1999 on his Sinfonia conducted by the composer), Pierre Boulez (Eclat, 1993), and (Helikopter String Quartet, 1996) with Karlheinz Stockhausen and the Arditti Quartet.

Contemporary composers and experimental projects
The history of Electronic Music, from Stockhausen to DJ Spooky and Squarepusher, was the subject of Sonic Acts film in (1998). This was followed by three experimental projects searching for the influence of the digital medium in film and music: Sonic Images (1998), Sonic Fragments / The Poetics of Digital Fragmentation (1999) and Sonic Genetics (2000).

In 1999 Scheffer made Music for Airports, a video on Brian Eno's music of the same name as arranged by Bang on a Can founders Julia Wolfe, Michael Gordon, David Lang and Evan Ziporyn. The sprawling In the Ocean (2001), on present day New York composers, features Steve Reich, Philip Glass, Elliott Carter, John Cage, Brian Eno and the Bang on a Can founders.

Scheffer is also working on several in depth films on specific composers — The Present Day Composer Refuses to Die on Frank Zappa, in cooperation with the Zappa Family Trust (2000, featuring The Mothers of Invention, Pierre Boulez and Ensemble Modern), and the 90-minute Zappa feature Phaze II, The Big Note (2002), to be followed by a third film which will complete his Zappa trilogy. Scheffer has been following and filming Elliott Carter for 25 years; this culminated in A Labyrinth of Time (2005), a portrait on the composer as well as a view of the history of modernism in the 20th century. In 2005 Scheffer also finished a feature-length documentary on the Tea-Opera composed by Tan Dun, with Pierre Audi (Director) and Xiu Ying(libretto), Tea. This film had its world premiere in the Museum of Modern Art in New York. In 2006 a retrospective of his work and a Docu-Concert was exhibited in the Museum of Modern Art in New York.

A documentary on the Tehran Philharmonic Orchestra and its chief conductor, the Iranian composer Nader Mashayekhi with the title To Be And Not To Be was premiered at the doku-arts festival June 2009. A feature-length documentary on composer Edgard Varèse with the title The One All Alone was selected for the 2009 Venice Film Festival. In 2010 he finished Eastern Voices featuring a.o. Syrian musician Ibrahim Keivo and one of the finest voices in the world today the Aserbajanian singer Alim Qasimov. It won the German Record Critics' Award 2011 (Preis der deutschen Schallplattenkritik) for the DVD in Germany. A feature-length documentary on the Iranian composer Nader Mashayekhi, Gozaran / Time Passing. In 2011 Gozaran / Time Passing was selected for the international competition of the IDFA (International Documentary Film Festival Amsterdam). To celebrate the 100th birthday of John Cage in 2012, he made an experimental film called Ryoanji and re-edited the film material shot in 1987 with the title: How To Get Out Of The Cage (A year with John Cage). It won again the German Record Critics' Award 2012 (Preis der deutschen Schallplattenkritik).  He is currently shooting a documentary on the Chinese composer Guo Wenjing and the Sichuan opera. In the future dramatic features based on Die Zauberflöte composed by Wolfgang Amadeus Mozart, the parallel lives of Gustav Mahler and Arnold Schönberg, are planned.

Filmography

As director / director & producer
Zoetrope People 1982, 60 min. (director): Doc. on o.a.Francis Ford Coppola and his studio with Wim Wenders, Tom Waits, Vittorio Storaro
Avalokiteshvara 1983, 58 min. (director): Doc. on the Dalai Lama of Tibet, co-directed with Marina Abramović
Time Is Music 1987, 60 min. (director): Doc. on composers Elliott Carter& John Cage
The Final Chorale 1990, 50 min. (director/producer): Doc. on Symphonies of Wind Instruments composed by Igor Stravinsky, Dutch Wind Ensemble conducted by Reinbert de Leeuw
And the Eareye Seeshears 1992, 60 min. (director/producer): Nine experimental films with live-music.
The Nature of Space 1993, 73 min. (director/producer):Feature-length Doc. on two Dutch architects: Dom Hans van der Laan and Anton Alberts.
Eclat 1993, 54 min. (director/producer): Doc. on 'Éclat' composed by Pierre Boulez, het Nieuw Ensemble conducted Ed Spanjaard.
Five Orchestral Pieces 1994, 55 min. (director/producer): Doc. on 'Fünf Orchesterstücke, opus 16' composed by Arnold Schönberg. Radio Philharmonic Orchestra conducted by Michael Gielen.
The Hidden Front 1995, 3x50 min. (director/producer): Doc. series in three parts on the resistance in the south of the Netherlands during the WWII
From Zero, A Group of Films 1995, 84 min. (director/producer):Experimental film in 4 parts with co-director Andrew Culver (USA)
From Zero, the Documentary 1995, 52 min. (director/producer): Doc. based on 'Fourteen' composed by John Cage, Ives Ensemble without conductor.
Helicopter String Quartet 1996, 77 min. (director/producer): Feature-length Doc. on 'Helicopter Streichquartett’ composed by Karlheinz Stockhausen, performed by the Arditti Quartet.
Conducting Mahler 1996, 75 min. (director/producer): Feature-length Doc. about the Mahler-Festival in Amsterdam (1995) with The Royal Concertgebouw Orchestra, Berlin Symphonic Orchestra, Vienna Philharmonic Orchestra conducted by Bernard Haitink, Claudio Abbado, Riccardo Chailly, Riccardo Muti and Simon Rattle.
The Road 1997, 90 min. (director/producer): Feature-length Doc. on 'Tao' composed by Louis Andriessen with Tomoko Mukaiyama (piano/koto) and the Dutch Radio Chamber Orchestra conducted by Péter Eötvös.
Sonic Acts 1998, 60 min. (director/producer): Doc. on the history of Electronic Music with a.o. Pierre Henry, Karlheinz Stockhausen, Michel Waisvisz, DJ Spooky, Merzbow and Squarepusher.
Attrazione d'amore 1998, 55 min. (director/producer): Doc. on chief-conductor Riccardo Chailly of the Royal Concertgebouw Orchestra.
Voyage to Cythera 1999, 52 min. (director/producer): Doc. on 'Sinfonia' composed by Luciano Berio The Swingle Singers with the Royal Concertgebouw Orchestra conducted by Luciano Berio.
Epoxy1999, 50 min. (director/producer): Experimental interdisciplinary live-video project with choreographer Krisztina de Châtel, composer Thom Willems and the Scapino Ballet Rotterdam.
Music for Airports 1999, 48 min. (director/producer): Experimental 'Ambient' video on 'Music for Airports' composed by Brian Eno and arranged by Julia Wolfe, Michael Gordon, David Lang and Evan Ziporyn, performed by The Bang On A Can All-Stars.
Frank Zappa: The Present Day Composer Refuses To Die 2000, 55 min. (director/producer): Doc. on the American composer Frank Zappa and members of 'The Mothers of Invention’ with a.o. Pierre Boulez and the Ensemble Modern conducted by Péter Eötvös.
In the Ocean 2001, 54 min. (director/producer): Doc. on the 'present-day' composers in New York, Julia Wolfe, Michael Gordon and David Lang who founded 'Bang on a Can' and their influences, with Steve Reich, Philip Glass, Louis Andriessen, Elliott Carter, John Cage, Frank Zappa and Brian Eno.
Frank Zappa – Phase Ii, The Big Note 2002, 90 min (director/producer): Doc. on the American composer Frank Zappa.
Mahler: Ich bin der Welt abhanden gekommen 2004, 55 min.  (director/producer): The third and final documentary of the Mahler-trilogy, with Riccardo Chailly and the Royal Concertgebouw Orchestra.
A Labyrinth of Time  2004, 94 min. (director/producer): Feature-length documentary on the greatest living composer: Elliott Carter. nd a view of the importance of modernism in the 20th century by Elliot Carter.
Tea  2005,  96 min. (director/producer): A feature-length documentary about the new opera ‘Tea’ of the Chinese composer Tan Dun and the wisdom of the tea-mind, with Xu Ying and Pierre Audi.
Frank Zappa: A Pioneer of the Future of Music, Part 1 & 2, 2007 2x 54min. (director/producer): Doc. On the American composer and rock guitarist Frank Zappa.
Max Beckmann: Transit Amsterdam, 2007 54min (directed by: Frank Scheffer, Rudolf Evenhuis and Jaap Guldenmond): Doc. about the famous German painter Max Beckmann.
Edgard Varese: Een Visionair in Muziek 2008, 54 min. (director/producer): Doc. on the French/American composer Edgard Varèse. The film shows his life as a visionary genius fighting for the future of music.
To Be and Not To Be, The Tehran Philharmonic Orchestra, 2009, 55 min. (director): Doc. about the young musicians of the Tehran Philharmonic Orchestra and it's chiefconductor, the Iranian composer Nader Mashayehki
The One All Alone, 2009, 90 min. (director/producer): Feature-length Doc. on the French/American composer Edgard Varèse. The film shows his life as a genius in sound and a visionary for the future of music.
Eastern Voices, 2010, 50 min. (director/producer; co-director Gunther Wallbrecht): Doc. on The Morgenland Festival in Osnabrueck, Germany featuring Alim Qusimov, Fargana, Ibrahim Kevo, Salar Aghili and the Morgenland Chamber Orchestra conducted by Nader Mashayekhi
Tiger Eyes, 2011, 55 min. (director): Doc. Jubilee film celebrating Forty years International Film Festival Rotterdam, with Wim Wenders, Raul Ruiz, Michael Haneke, Abbas Kiarostami, Abderrahmane Sissako, Apichatpong Weerasethakul, Jim Jarmusch.
Gozaran/ Time Passing, 2011, 90 min. (director): Feature-length Doc. about the young musicians of the Teheran Philharmonic Orchestra and it's chiefconductor, the Iranian composer Nader Mashayehki.
Hypnagogia, 2011, 12min. (director): Dance film with the Iraqi choreographer Muhanad Rasjeed
Ryoanji, 2011, 60min (director, producer): Experimental film based on the Japanese zen garden in Kyoto. With the composition Ryoanji composed by John Cage
How To Get Out of the Cage (A year with John Cage), 2012, 56min. (director, producer): Doc. on John Cage celebrating his 100th birthday in the form of a re-edit of partially unused film material shot in 1987.
Imagine Utopia, 2012, 55min (director, producer): Doc. on the ATLAS ACADEMY. In August 2012 some of the best traditional musicians from the Middle East, India, China and Japan gathered in Amsterdam to play together and exchange their cultural heritage.

As producer
Chessfilmnoise 1988 24min. 35mm: Experimental film and the first film directed by American composer John Cage
Senses Are the Feet of the Soul 1994 for NPS Television, 70min: Doc. on poet/writer Dick Hillenius, directed by Brigit Hillenius
Hexagon 1995, 75min: 6 short experimental films based on the relation between a composer and a filmmaker, directed a.o by Theo Verbey/Alejandro Agresti, Willem Breuker/Johan van der Keuken, Otto Ketting/Eric van Zuylen, Theo Loevendie/Jelle Nesna, Richard Rijnvos/Frank Zweers, Diderik Wagenaar/Frank Scheffer, etc.
Memory of the Unknown 1996, 75min: Feature film directed by Nathalie Alonso Casale
Detail Unwound 1997, 55min: Doc. on the Dutch composer Thom Willems and the American choreographer William Forsythe, directed by Ramon Gieling.
Andres Serrano: A History of Sex 1997, 55 min: Doc. on contemporary artist and photographer Andres Serrano, directed by Marten Rabarts and Brigit Hillenius.
The Future Is in an Hour 1997, 95 min: Doc. on the music and culture of gypsies in Sevilla (Spain), directed by Ramon Gieling.
To Sang FotostudiO 1998, 30 min: Doc. on the Chinese photographer To Sang and his multi-cultural neighborhood in Amsterdam, Fotostudio', directed by Johan van der Keuken
Living with Your Eyes 1998, 55 min: Doc. on the filmmaker Johan van der Keuken who is creating 'To Sang Fotostudio', directed by Ramon Gieling.
Sonic Images 1998, 70 min: 6 short experimental video's based on the relation between an electronic composer and a digital filmmaker: Floris Boddendijk Joost Rekeld, DJ Spooky / Rob Schroder, Squarepusher / Alexander Oey, Merzbow / Ian Kerkhof, Michel Waisvisz / Frank Scheffer, Karlheinz Stockhausen / Frank Scheffer.
Sonic Fragments the Poetics of Digital Fragmentation 2000, 80 min: 7 short experimental video's bases on a re-mix of the 'Sonic Images' video-footage, directed by Ian Kerkhof, Miriam Kruishoop, Joost Rekveld, Alexander Oey, Rob Schroder, Micha Klein and Frank Scheffer.
Sonic Genetics 2001, 60 min: 5 short experimental video's based on a re-mix of the 'Sonic Fragments' video-footage, directed by Dick Tuinder, Gerald van der Kaap, Phillip 'Virus' Reichenheim, Ian Kerkhof and Frank Scheffer.
Where Was I 2001, 55 min: Doc. on the American Pop singer and 'Legend' Tim Rose who performed "Hey Joe' before it made Jimi Hendrix famous, directed by Jacques Laureys.
Most Things Never Happen 2006, 10 min: Short experimental film on a little girl Shelley the Winter who has profound thoughts. Directed by: Dick Tuinder.
Landscapes Unknown 2007, 55 min (prod.) Directed by: Riekje Ziengs and Melle van Essen. About a.o.the Dutch artist Jan Hendriks, African photographer Malick Sidibé  and Dutch artist Frans Walon. Premiere at IDFA 2007.

Retrospectives
 2001 Holland Festival in Amsterdam, Netherlands
 2006 MoMA in New York, United States
 2007 Wien Modern Festival in Vienna, Austria
 2008 Mumbai Film Festival in Mumbai, India and May Festival in Beijing, China
 2011 Flaherty Seminar, Colgate University, Hamilton, New York, United States
 2012 Istanbul Museum of Modern Art, Turkey and Soundtrack Cologne, Germany

External links

Frank Scheffer at Linkedin
Frank Scheffer at Mode Records

1956 births
Dutch cinematographers
Dutch film producers
Living people
People from Venlo
Design Academy Eindhoven alumni